The Alwasl University operates programs aimed at foreign students, including non-Muslims.
Instruction is offered in Arabic, French and English.

References

External links 
 

Universities and colleges in Dubai
Arab studies